Major-General Sir Colin John Mackenzie  (26 November 1861 – 7 July 1956) was a British soldier and Chief of the General Staff, the head of the Canadian Militia (later the Canadian Army), from 1910 until 1913.

Background
Mackenzie was the eldest son of Major-General Colin Mackenzie, of the Madras Staff Corps, by Victoria Henrietta Mackinnon (the eldest daughter of Charles Mackinnon of Corriechatachan). His paternal grandfather, John Mackenzie of Inverness, a banker, was descended from the Mackenzies of Portmore.

Military career
Educated at Edinburgh Academy and at Royal Military College, Sandhurst, Mackenzie was commissioned into the Bedfordshire Regiment of the British Army, at the time the 16th Regiment of Foot in January, 1881, but soon transferred into the Seaforth Highlanders. He took part in the Nile expedition of 1882, the Burma expedition of 1886 and the Hazara expedition in 1888, and was promoted to captain on 25 October 1889. Following promotion to major on 27 April 1892, he served as Deputy Assistant Adjutant General for the Quetta District of India from 1892 to 1896. He also took part in the Waziristan expedition of 1894 and the Nile expedition of 1898. He then attended and later graduated from the Staff College, Camberley.

The following year Mackenzie went to South Africa on the outbreak of the Second Boer War, and from 1900 he served as Director of Intelligence on the staff of the Commander-in-Chief, Lord Roberts. In a despatch dated 31 March 1900, Lord Roberts described how Mackenzie "afforded … material assistance by the accurate and valuable reports he submitted". He received the brevet rank of lieutenant colonel on 29 November 1900. In the later stages of the war, he became Military Governor of Johannesburg. Following the end of hostilities in June 1902, he returned to the United Kingdom in the SS Dunottar Castle, which arrived at Southampton the following month. For his service in the war, Mackenzie was appointed a Companion of the Order of the Bath (CB) in the April 1901 South Africa Honours list (the award was dated to 29 November 1900), and he received the actual decoration after his return home, from King Edward VII at Buckingham Palace on 24 October 1902.

In September 1902 he received the substantive rank of lieutenant-colonel, and was appointed Assistant Quartermaster General for the 5th Division, within the 2nd Army Corps, based in Dover as part of the staff of the South-Eastern military district. He was Assistant Adjutant General at Army Headquarters from 1905 and Commander of 6th Infantry Brigade at Aldershot Command in 1907.

From 1910 to 1913, he was Chief of the General Staff, Canada. His departure from that post was caused in part by a disagreement between Mackenzie and Sam Hughes, the Canadian Minister of Militia and Defence, as to (among other things) the merits of the Ross rifle. Mackenzie subsequently regarded himself as vindicated by the Ross rifle's unsuitability for combat conditions on the Western Front.

On 3 March 1914, he became General Officer Commanding the Highland Division. He served in the First World War as General Officer Commanding the Highland Division, as General Officer Commanding 9th (Scottish) Division, as General Officer Commanding 15th (Scottish) Division and as General Officer Commanding 3rd Division on the Western Front all in 1914. He took over 3rd Division following the death in action of Major-General Hubert Hamilton; however he only lasted for two weeks in this post before he was relieved of his command following the inconclusive result at the Battle of La Bassée in October 1914.

He went on to be Director of Staff Duties at the War Office in 1915 and General Officer Commanding 61st Division from February 1916 and was engaged in the disastrous diversionary battle for the Somme offensive at Fromelles on 19 July 1916. This operation led to the death of many Australian and British soldiers and achieved nothing. Casualties were: 5th Australian Division had 5,513 casualties and the 61st British Division had 1,547 casualties.

Mackenzie himself was wounded by an enemy sniper on 27 April 1918 while he was visiting the line of the 183rd Brigade south of St. Floris, being shot through the cheek and parotid gland. The wound did not respond to treatment and he was evacuated sick to England on 31 May 1918.

Thereafter, Mackenzie was Inspector of Infantry in 1918 and Commander of the Dover Area 1919 until his retirement from the army on 1 April 1920. Between 1924 and 1931, he was Colonel of the Seaforth Highlanders.

Family
Mackenzie married Ethel Ross, the daughter of Hercules Grey Ross I.C.S. and Mary Henderson. They had one son, Colin Hercules Mackenzie.

References

Bibliography

Further reading

|-
 

|-

|-

|-

|-

1861 births
1956 deaths
British Army major generals
Graduates of the Staff College, Camberley
Bedfordshire and Hertfordshire Regiment officers
Seaforth Highlanders officers
British Army personnel of the Mahdist War
British military personnel of the Third Anglo-Burmese War
British Army personnel of the Second Boer War
British Army generals of World War I
Commanders of the Canadian Army
Canadian generals
Knights Commander of the Order of the Bath
British military personnel of the Hunza-Naga Campaign
People educated at Edinburgh Academy
British military personnel of the Hazara Expedition of 1888
Graduates of the Royal Military College, Sandhurst